KKEG (98.3 FM, "98.3 KKEG") is a commercial radio station broadcasting a mainstream rock radio format. Licensed to Bentonville, it serves Northwest Arkansas and is owned by Cumulus Media. The studios and offices are on Frontage Road in Fayetteville.

KKEG has an effective radiated power (ERP) of 100,000 watts, the maximum for non-grandfathered FM stations. The transmitter is on Pug Gayer Road in Fayetteville. The signal is heard in parts of Arkansas, Missouri and Oklahoma.

History
In 1969, the station signed on as Northwest Arkansas' only rock station, originally at 92.1 MHz in Fayetteville, Arkansas. The format was free form, allowing the disc jockeys to choose the music they wanted to play, with the freedom to discuss music, pop culture and other topics between songs.

In the late 1970s, the station moved to a more structured playlist. The station aired tracks from the most popular rock albums. In 1980, KKEG was the first Northwest Arkansas radio station to give away a new vehicle. In 1999, KKEG celebrated 30 years of broadcasting rock and roll to Northwest Arkansas listeners by giving away a home.

On June 11, 2009, the rock format on 92.1 FM Fayetteville was moved to 98.3 FM as "98.3 The Keg" along with the KKEG call sign. The KQSM-FM call sign was moved to 92.1 FM.

Past DJs: Jack Daniels, Mojo, Droid, Laura K., Dave Fry, Joel Casey, JB, Sandy Scott, Jon Williams, Stash, Mareike, Miller.

References

External links

Mainstream rock radio stations in the United States
KEG
Radio stations established in 1982
Cumulus Media radio stations
1982 establishments in Arkansas